Rayak Air Base ( | Kaidat Rayak al-jawiya)  is Lebanon's first air base and the place where the Lebanese Air Force was born on June 1, 1949. In the 1950s the RAF sent its own instructors to help the Lebanese Airforce. British families accompanied instructors. The base had connections with Airforce bases on Cyprus. It was an idyllic location situated very close to a vineyard which now supplies wines throughout Europe, including London. Located in the middle of the Bekaa Valley to the east, between the towns of Zahlé and Anjar, it symbolizes the Lebanese Air Force best, and is home for most of the aircraft types that have seen service and the final resting place for almost all retiring planes.

The airfield has been in use since 1914 by various foreign forces such as German, Ottoman, British and French.

History
Rayak Air Base was constructed and used by the Germans in World War I. After liberation by the allies Armee d'l'air personnel trained Lebanese Air Force technicians in aircraft maintenance. On 1 August 1945, Lebanon took command of its armed forces, including Rayak air base.

During the French Mandate of Lebanon, Rayak Air base was considered to be the "jewel" of the Air bases and the centre of attraction of all other military units, not only in Lebanon but also in mandated Syria and all the Near East. The base had many entertainment facilities, luxuries, flowering gardens, and central heating, which at that time were not found in military sites elsewhere in the region. In a memoir, author Roald Dahl recounts an event in the Syria-Lebanon campaign of 1941 when British forces defeated forces of Vichy France in the area. He, as part of a formation of Royal Air Force Hawker Hurricane fighters, attacked the Rayak airfield, which was being used by Vichy pilots. He says that as he and his fellow Hurricane pilots swept in:

. . . low over the field at midday we saw to our astonishment a bunch of girls in brightly coloured cotton dresses standing out by the planes with glasses in their hands having drinks with the French pilots, and I remember seeing bottles of wine standing on the wing of one of the planes as we went swooshing over. It was a Sunday morning and the Frenchmen were evidently entertaining their girlfriends and showing off their aircraft to them, which was a very French thing to do in the middle of a war at a front-line aerodrome. Every one of us held our fire on that first pass over the flying field and it was wonderfully comical to see the girls all dropping their wine glasses and galloping in their high heels for the door of the nearest building. We went round again, but this time we were no longer a surprise and they were ready for us with their ground defences, and I am afraid that our chivalry resulted in damage to several of our Hurricanes, including my own. But we destroyed five of their planes on the ground. 

After defeat of the Vichy forces, Rayak was used by Allied air forces, including 451 Squadron of the Royal Australian Air Force. 

The French Air Force evacuated the base in 1949, and it was abandoned for a long time, which contributed to turning it into a miserable condition, especially after being looted by its own guards. The army command later decided to rebuild the air base, a reconstruction that took two months and which included the construction of new buildings and infrastructure.

The first officers assigned to the base were:
 Deputy Commander Lt. Ahmad Arab
 Administrative officer Antranik Tatoussian
 Service battalion officer Victor Charles

Recruitment started with one hundred personnel, many of whom already had experience with the French.
The first course students included:
 Lt. Ali Abboud
 Sergeant John Ayoub
 Sergeant Izat Hariri
 Civil pilot Hassan Badawi
 Civil pilot René Abdallah 
 Civil pilot Michel Charles
 Civil pilot Michel Nawfal or Michel Naufal 
 Civil pilot Emil Succar

Facilities

An administration building, several hangars (most of these built during the French Mandate of Lebanon), a control tower, officers club, houses, parachutes tower, barracks, and workshops make up the airport. In addition, both runways are equipped with a low intensity runway lights (LIRL) lighting system.

Aviation School & Technical

The airbase is the home to the Lebanese Air Force Aviation School which trains air force pilots. The school currently employs Robinson Raven R44 II helicopters and Bulldog T1 propeller for these training purposes.

The Lebanese Air Force Technical School is also located at Rayak Air Base. Its goal is to qualify technicians for the whole air force.

The base is home to the only flight simulator in the Lebanese military. A new facility housing a UH-1 Helicopter simulator from the US military is now being used to train future Lebanese pilots.

Lebanon Air Force Museum
Rayak Air Base is also home to the Lebanese Air Force Museum, as it contains all of the old aircraft and the majority of grounded aircraft. The museum is not open to the public, however, and visitors must obtain permission to visit from air force authorities.

The museum displays:
 1 de Havilland Vampire T55
 2 Hawker Hunter F6
 1 Sud Aviation SE3130 Alouette II
 5 Sud Aviation SA316B Alouette III
 2 Agusta Bell AB212
 8 Fouga CM170 Magister
 5 Aerospatiale SA342L Gazelle

The museum comprises one hangar and is intended to become a public museum in the future.

Hawker Hunters
Lebanon's Hawker Hunter jets, much like the rest of its grounded fixed-wing jets, are stored at Rayak. In 2007 the LAF began the process of restoring the Hunters to airworthy condition. Initially these were to be used against the Fatah al-Islam terrorist group which the army was battling during the Nahr el-Bared Operation, but this operation ended before the air force was able to complete their restoration. During November 2008, the air force made three Hunters operational, and displayed them during Lebanon's 65th independence anniversary on November 22, 2008. The base has always been considered to be the home of those aircraft; however, during the eighties the Hunters had to move to Hallat strip due to the close proximity of the air base to Syria. The Hunters later returned to the base, yet were grounded during 1994. All fights during 2008, after restoration, were carried out from this base.

Attacks
Like the rest of Lebanon's airports, the runways at Rayak were bombed by the Israeli Air Force on July 13, 2006, during the 2006 Lebanon War. A bomb on each runway was sufficient to punch deep holes and render the airport disabled.

Notable visits
 On September 1, 1942, General de Gaulle
 On September 26, 1949, Marquise de Freij and his wife.
 On October 17, 1949, the British General Hayes, the supreme commander of the British troops in the Middle East, visited Rayak Air base and had lunch with its officers and the British squad there. 
 On November 28, 1954, the US air force commander in West Tripoli General Glandburg

See also

 Beirut Air Base
 Rene Mouawad Air Base

References

External links

 Global Security - Lebanese Air Force

Airports in Lebanon
Lebanese Air Force bases